Ivan Mršić (born 24 June 1991), is a former Bosnian-Herzegovinian professional footballer of Croat ethnicity, who last played for FC ViOn Zlaté Moravce as a defender.

Club career

ViOn Zlaté Moravce
He made his Fortuna Liga debut for ViOn Zlaté Moravce against Slovan Bratislava on 19 July 2015.

References

External links
 Futbalnet profile
 Fortuna Liga profile
 

1991 births
Living people
Sportspeople from Mostar
Association football defenders
Bosnia and Herzegovina footballers
Bosnia and Herzegovina youth international footballers
NK Lokomotiva Zagreb players
NK Inter Zaprešić players
NK Hrvatski Dragovoljac players
FC ViOn Zlaté Moravce players
Croatian Football League players
First Football League (Croatia) players
Slovak Super Liga players
Bosnia and Herzegovina expatriate footballers
Expatriate footballers in Croatia
Bosnia and Herzegovina expatriate sportspeople in Croatia
Expatriate footballers in Slovakia
Bosnia and Herzegovina expatriate sportspeople in Slovakia